Dolany may refer to places:

Czech Republic
Dolany (Kladno District), a municipality and village in the Central Bohemian Region
Dolany (Klatovy District), a municipality and village in the Plzeň Region
Dolany (Náchod District), a municipality and village in the Hradec Králové Region
Dolany (Olomouc District), a municipality and village in the Olomouc Region
Dolany (Pardubice District), a municipality and village in the Pardubice Region
Dolany (Plzeň-North District), a municipality and village in the Plzeň Region
Dolany nad Vltavou (until 2016 Dolany), a municipality and village in the Central Bohemian Region
Dolany, a village and part of Červené Pečky in the Central Bohemian Region
Dolany, a village and part of Čkyně in the South Bohemian Region
Dolany, a village and part of Hluboká (Chrudim District) in the Central Bohemian Region
Dolany, a village and part of Jičíněves in the Hradec Králové Region
Dolany, a village and part of Mladkov in the Pardubice Region

Poland
Dolany, Lesser Poland Voivodeship, south Poland
Dolany, Greater Poland Voivodeship, west-central Poland

See also
Doljani (disambiguation)